The Atomic Mr. Basie (originally called Basie, also known as E=MC2 and reissued in 1994 as The Complete Atomic Basie) is a 1958 album by Count Basie and his orchestra. Allmusic gave it 5 stars, reviewer Bruce Eder saying: "it took Basie's core audience and a lot of other people by surprise, as a bold, forward-looking statement within the context of a big-band recording." It is included in the book 1001 Albums You Must Hear Before You Die, Will Fulford-Jones calling it "Basie's last great record." It was voted number 411 in the third edition of Colin Larkin's All Time Top 1000 Albums (2000). According to Acclaimed Music, it is the 6th most critically acclaimed album of 1958, the 25th most acclaimed of the 1950s, and the 837th most acclaimed of all time, based on an aggregation of hundreds of critics' lists from around the world.

Reception
The album won Best Jazz Performance, Group and Best Performance by a Dance Band awards at the 1st Annual Grammy Awards.

Track listing
All tracks composed and arranged by Neal Hefti, except where indicated.

Personnel
Wendell Culley — trumpet
Snooky Young — trumpet
Thad Jones — trumpet
Joe Newman — trumpet
Henry Coker — trombone
Al Grey — trombone
Benny Powell — trombone
Marshal Royal — reeds
Frank Wess — reeds
Eddie "Lockjaw" Davis — reeds
Frank Foster — reeds
Charles Fowlkes — reeds
Count Basie — piano
Eddie Jones — bass
Freddie Green — guitar
Sonny Payne — drums
Joe Williams — vocals (track 16)
Neal Hefti — arrangements (tracks 1–11)
Jimmy Mundy — arrangements (tracks 12–14)

Notes and references

Notes

References 

1958 albums
Roulette Records albums
Albums produced by Teddy Reig
Count Basie Orchestra albums
Grammy Award for Best Jazz Instrumental Album
Grammy Award for Best Performance by an Orchestra – for Dancing